Antarchaea terminalis is a moth in the family Noctuidae. It was described by Paul Mabille in 1880. It is found on Madagascar.

References

Catocalinae
Moths described in 1880
Moths of Madagascar